Caught in the Rain may refer to:
Caught in the Rain, a 1914 film
Caught in the Rain, a 1912 film
Caught in the Rain, a 1910 film
Caught in the Rain (song), a song by American post-grunge band Revis